Central Washington University (CWU) is a public university in Ellensburg, Washington. Founded in 1891, the university consists of four divisions: the President's Division, Business and Financial Affairs, Operations, and Academic and Student Life (ASL). Within ASL are four colleges: the College of Arts and Humanities, the College of Business (Ellensburg campus and University Centers in the Puget Sound and central regions), the College of Education and Professional Studies, and College of the Sciences. CWU is considered an emerging Hispanic-Serving Institution and 15 percent of its students are Hispanic.

History
In 1890, the state Legislature established the Washington State Normal School (WSNS) in Ellensburg for "the training and education of teachers in the art of instructing and governing in the public schools of this state." WSNS opened on September 6, 1891, with its first classes held at the Washington Public School in Ellensburg. In 1893, the school's first building was constructed and named Barge Hall, in honor of the first WSNS principal, Benjamin Franklin Barge. Barge Hall was added to the National Register of Historic Places in 1976.

In subsequent years, the university constructed additional campus buildings to accommodate a growing student body including: Kamola Hall (1911); Smyser Hall (1925); Munson Hall (1926); Sue Lombard Hall (1926); and McConnell Auditorium (1935). While Barge Hall's architecture reflected a Richardsonian Romanesque style, the designs of later buildings incorporated elements of proto-Modernism, along with Spanish Colonial Revival, Neo-Classical and Classical Revival styles. In the late 20th and early 21st centuries, as academic programs expanded, construction of new buildings took place: the Science Building I (1997); Black Hall (1998); the Student Union and Recreation Center (2006); Jerilyn McIntyre Music Education Facility (2007); Wendell Hill Hall and Mechanical Building (2008), Barto Hall (2012), Science Building II (2016), and the Samuelson STEM Center (2018).

Name and expansion of programs
In 1937, the Washington Legislature authorized a name change to Central Washington College of Education. In 1961, reflecting that the curriculum had expanded into new areas of study in addition to teacher education, the school's name was changed to Central Washington State College. With addition of graduate programs and curricula, it became Central Washington University in 1977.

Residential campus 

The residential campus location has multiple residence halls, surrounding the Student Union and Recreation Center, and clustered in four different areas. The STEM and teaching facilities are located near the administrative buildings, which include Black Hall, Bouillon Hall, and the Science Building near Dean Hall (see map on right).

Administrative buildings 
Barge Hall and Mitchell Hall are where the primary administrative staff are located. Admissions, Running Start, a Cashiers Office, the Registrar, and financial aid are all located in this area. This region is bounded by Samuelson Hall and the residential Kamola Hall and Sue Lombard Hall.

Student Union and Recreation Center 
On April 26, 2006, the school opened the $58 million Student Union and Recreation Center. The Student Union and Recreation Center is home to a full-sized rock-climbing wall, fully equipped gymnasium, and an outdoor recreation office that rents sports equipment.

Wildcat Farm 
The Wildcat Farm  at the eastern side of campus grows fresh produce for CWU Dining Services and provides space for students and faculty to run experiments or projects centered around food and farming. Examples have included studying soil carbon respiration, offering K-12 education programs, and piloting dryland winter wheat production.

Sustainability Initiatives 
The Ellensburg campus features several LEED-certified (Leadership in Energy and Environmental Design) buildings including Hogue Hall (LEED Gold), Barto Hall (LEED Platinum), and Discovery Hall (LEED Gold). Other Sustainability measures include installing EV charging stations, solar panels, water bottle refilling stations, and implementing xeriscaping and grounds mulch to conserve water. Students, faculty, and staff have been involved in the Wilson Creek Restoration project, the annual clean-up of Englehorn pond, and planting a native garden in front of Dean Hall.

CWU University Centers 
In addition to the residential campus in Ellensburg, Central Washington University has multiple locations around the state of Washington.

 CWU-Des Moines, located at Highline Community College
 CWU-Everett, located at Everett Community College
 CWU-Lynnwood, located at Edmonds College
 CWU-Pierce County, located at Pierce College
 CWU-Moses Lake, located at Big Bend Community College
 CWU-Sammamish, located at the city-owned facility at 120 228th Ave. N.E.
 CWU-Wenatchee, located at Wenatchee Valley College
 CWU-Yakima, located at Yakima Valley Community College

Research
The Pacific Northwest Geodetic Array (PANGA) uses real-time GPS measurements to research and measure crustal deformation and mitigate natural hazards throughout the Pacific Northwest. These hazards arise from earthquakes, volcanic eruptions, landslides, and coastal sea-level encroachment. In addition, PANGA GPS measurements are used to monitor man-made structures such as Seattle's sagging Alaskan Way Viaduct, 520 and I-90 floating bridges and power-generation / drinking-supply dams throughout the Cascadia subduction zone, including the mega-dams along the Columbia River. GPS data are telemetered in real-time back to CWU, where they are processed in real-time using both JPL's RTG software as well as Trimble's RTKNet Integrity Manager software to provide relative positioning of several mm resolution.
 The Primate Behavior & Ecology program at Central Washington University offers the only baccalaureate degree in primatology in the world and one of the few master's degree in primatology in the United States. The program focuses on non-invasive, observational research with nonhuman primates in field and captive settings. The program also offers the only Captive Primate Care Certificate in the United States and is affiliated with Chimpanzee Sanctuary Northwest. Faculty and students study across the entire primate order, collaborating with scientists and conducting research at sites around the world. Recent published work includes the impact of COVID-19 on mammals at tourism sites, the behavior of Tibetan macaques at the Valley of the Wild Monkeys in China, and the social networks of chimpanzees.  The Primate Behavior graduate program is part of the Western Regional Graduate Program, through which student residents of 15 western states pay in-state tuition.
 Wine Quality Research Initiative has identified the nature of wine faults in some wines and how to prevent them. Currently the initiative is directed at detecting and preventing wine fraud, a lucrative and growing crime in the wine import/export business.

Athletics

CWU students, alumni, and varsity athletes are known as the "Wildcats" and their colors are crimson and black. CWU is part of NCAA Division II and is part of the Great Northwest Athletic Conference. However, the men's and women's rugby teams are NCAA Division I and are usually nationally ranked.

Notable alumni

References

External links

Central Washington Athletics website

 
Public universities and colleges in Washington (state)
Universities and colleges accredited by the Northwest Commission on Colleges and Universities
Educational institutions established in 1891
Education in Kittitas County, Washington
Buildings and structures in Kittitas County, Washington
Tourist attractions in Kittitas County, Washington
1891 establishments in Washington (state)